Middlesex College may refer to:
 Middlesex College (New Jersey)
 Middlesex College (United Kingdom)
 Middlesex College (University of Western Ontario)
 Middlesex University (Massachusetts)

See also
 Middlesex Community College (disambiguation)